Guna Sundari or Gunasundari is a 1955 Indian Tamil-language film starring Gemini Ganesan and Savitri. The film was remake of the 1949 Telugu film Gunasundari Katha. It was not successful at the box office.

Plot 
Ugra Senan is the king of Dhara Nagaram. He has three daughters, Rupasundari, Hemasundari and Gunasundari.

Gunasundari is the youngest. Their mother dies when Gunasundari is born. Ugra Senan brings up the three girls with the utmost care. After the girls are grown up, one day during a chat between father and daughters, the two older daughters declare that the father is the most important person in a girl's life. However, Gunasundari differs from them and says that the husband is the most important person in a girl's life. Father Ugra Senan becomes displeased and angry at Gunasundari. He marries off the two older daughters to their cousins. But in order to teach Gunasundari a lesson, he marries her off to an aged pauper with a physical deformity.

After the wedding, the king learns that the pauper is actually a young prince but suffers from a curse. The king orders Gunasundari and her husband to leave his kingdom. They then live in a hut outside the kingdom.

The king become ill. The native physicians says his illness can be cured only with a rare gem called Mahendra Mani. Gunasundari's husband goes in search of the gem and succeeds in finding it. He is turned into a bear due to another curse. His two elder brothers-in-law rob the gem from him and give it to the king who is then cured.

Gunasundari prays to Lord Shiva and Parvati regularly. Shiva and Parvati are pleased with her devotion and bless her and her husband. Relieved of his curses, Gunasundari's husband regains his handsome princely form.

The king learns the truth. He recalls Gunasundari and her husband back to the kingdom and crowns them King and Queen.

Cast 

Male cast
 R. Ganesh as prince
 M. E. Madhavan as deformed prince
 S. V. Ranga Rao as Ugrasenan
 M. N. Nambiar as second son-in-law
 A. Karunanidhi as Eldest son-in-law
 Duraisami
 V. M. Ezhumalai
 R. Nageswara Rao
 C. V. V. Panthulu
 R. S. Ramaswamy
 E. R. Sahadevan
 Balakrishna

Female cast
 Savitri as Gunasundari
 Lakshmi Prabha as Rupasundari
 T. P. Muthulakshmi as Hemasundari
 A. Kamala Chandrababu
 T. N. Meenakshi
 Rushyendramani
 Seetha
 Rajani
 Dhanam
 Kumari Thulasi
 Baby Sharada
 Baby Jaya & Nirmala
 Baby Uma & Komala

Production 
B. N. Reddy and A. Chakrapani produced the film under the banner Vijaya Productions. The film was made in Telugu with the title Gunasundari Katha with Sriranjani and Kasturi Siva Rao. The Telugu film was released in 1949. The film is said to be inspired from Shakespeare's King Lear.

Soundtrack 
Music was composed by Ghantasala and lyrics for all songs were penned by Thanjai N. Ramaiah Dass.

Box office 
This Tamil version Gunasundari was a flop. However, the Telugu version Gunasundari Katha was a success and remained a favourite of producer B. Nagi Reddy.

References

External links
 

1955 films
1950s Tamil-language films
Indian black-and-white films
Films based on King Lear
Films scored by Ghantasala (musician)
Films directed by Kamalakara Kameswara Rao
Tamil remakes of Telugu films